The Crown Jewels is a box set by Queen which comprises their first eight studio albums; Queen, Queen II, Sheer Heart Attack, A Night at the Opera, A Day at the Races, News of the World, Jazz and The Game; in sleeves replicating the original vinyl packaging. The last three albums in the set (News of the World, Jazz and The Game) all have modified packaging with alternative covers. A lyric booklet is also included. All the albums have been remastered. The box set marks the 25th anniversary of the group's existence dated to the release of their first album.

8 CD Set
Queen (1973) - 38:47
Queen II (1974) - 40:47
Sheer Heart Attack (1974) - 39:01
A Night at the Opera (1975) - 43:03
A Day at the Races (1976) - 44:22
News of the World (1977) - 39:19
Jazz (1978) - 44:48
The Game (1980) - 35:38

References

Queen (band) compilation albums
1998 compilation albums
Hollywood Records compilation albums